The Journal of Sport & Social Issues is a peer-reviewed academic journal that publishes papers in the field of sociology. The journal's editor is C. L. Cole (University of Illinois). It has been in publication since 1977 and is currently published by SAGE Publications.

Scope 
The Journal of Sport & Social Issues publishes research, discussion and analysis on contemporary sport issues. The journal is of an international, interdisciplinary perspective and aims to examine pressing, topical questions about sport. The Journal of Sport & Social Issues studies the impact of sport on and in areas such as psychology, cultural studies and anthropology.

Abstracting and indexing 
The Journal of Sport & Social Issues is abstracted and indexed in, among other databases:  SCOPUS, and the Social Sciences Citation Index. According to the Journal Citation Reports, its 2020 impact factor is 2.760, ranking it 46 out of 149 journals in the category ‘Sociology’. and 41 out of 58 journals in the category ‘Hospitality, Leisure, Sport & Tourism’.

References

External links 
 

SAGE Publishing academic journals
English-language journals
Publications established in 1977
Quarterly journals
Sociology of sport journals